Call of the Rockies may refer to:

 Call of the Rockies (1938 film), 1938 American western film directed by Alan James
 Call of the Rockies (1944 film), 1944 American Western film directed by Lesley Selander

See also
 All Faces West, a 1929 American western film also known by this title